Cuerpo de Quinteros y Labradores (Corps of farmers and Labradors) was a military unit of cavalry formed on the occasion of the English invasions to the Río de la Plata.

History 

This military unit was formed by farmers of the province of Buenos Aires, being their Commanders in chiefs Don Antonio Luciano de Ballester, a rich landowner, born in Buenos Aires, and Juan Clavería, born in Escou, France. 

The Corps of Quinteros and Labradores had two squads with volunteers from the haciendas of Buenos Aires. They were divided into six companies, to fulfill surveillance missions. Its armament consisted in spears, swords and some pistols and carbines, provided by farmers.

Distinción Real 

List of the members of the Cuerpo de Quinteros y Labradores who were distinguished (promotions) in the name of Fernando VII of España, for their heroic action in the defense of Buenos Aires against the English troops.

 Antonio Luciano Ballester - teniente coronel
 Juan Clavería - teniente coronel
 José López Brizuela - capitán
 Tomás de Arana - capitán
 Domingo Antonio Santiago - capitán
 José Antonio Rosende - capitán
 Miguel Busquet - capitán
 Francisco Palón - capitán
 Luciano de Barreda - capitán
 José Canaveris - teniente
 Vicente Lastra - teniente
 Juan José Albana - teniente
 Antonio Salvañac - teniente
 Ramón Uriarte - teniente
 Pedro Blanco - teniente
 Anacleto de las Cajigas - teniente
 Francisco Sarracan - teniente
 José Reyes - teniente
 Manuel Amat - teniente
 Francisco Olascuaga - alférez
 Miguel Toro - alférez
 Pedro Posadas - alférez
 Juan Rosende - alférez
 José Díaz - alférez
 Francisco Bastos - alférez

References 

Regiments of Argentina
Military history of Argentina
Río de la Plata